In mathematics, the Euler–Tricomi equation is a linear partial differential equation useful in the study of transonic flow.  It is named after mathematicians Leonhard Euler and Francesco Giacomo Tricomi.

It is elliptic in the half plane x > 0, parabolic at x = 0 and hyperbolic in the half plane x < 0.
Its characteristics are

which have the integral 

where C is a constant of integration.  The characteristics thus comprise two families of semicubical parabolas, with cusps on the line x = 0, the curves lying on the right hand side of the y-axis.

Particular solutions

A general expression for particular solutions to the Euler–Tricomi equations is:

where

 
 
 
 

These can be linearly combined to form further solutions such as:

for k = 0:

for k = 1:

etc.

The Euler–Tricomi equation is a limiting form of Chaplygin's equation.

See also
Burgers equation
Chaplygin's equation

Bibliography 
 A. D. Polyanin, Handbook of Linear Partial Differential Equations for Engineers and Scientists, Chapman & Hall/CRC Press, 2002.

External links
 Tricomi and Generalized Tricomi Equations at EqWorld: The World of Mathematical Equations.

Partial differential equations
Equations of fluid dynamics
Leonhard Euler